A microarray is a multiplex lab-on-a-chip. Its purpose is to simultaneously detect the expression of thousands of genes from a sample (e.g. from a tissue). It is a two-dimensional array on a solid substrate—usually a glass slide or silicon thin-film cell—that assays (tests) large amounts of biological material using high-throughput screening miniaturized, multiplexed and parallel processing and detection methods. The concept and methodology of microarrays was first introduced and illustrated in antibody microarrays (also referred to as antibody matrix) by Tse Wen Chang in 1983 in a scientific publication and a series of patents. The "gene chip" industry started to grow significantly after the 1995 Science Magazine article by the Ron Davis and Pat Brown labs at Stanford University. With the establishment of companies, such as Affymetrix, Agilent, Applied Microarrays, Arrayjet, Illumina, and others, the technology of DNA microarrays has become the most sophisticated and the most widely used, while the use of protein, peptide and carbohydrate microarrays is expanding.

Types of microarrays include:
DNA microarrays, such as cDNA microarrays, oligonucleotide microarrays, BAC microarrays and SNP microarrays
MMChips, for surveillance of microRNA populations
Protein microarrays
Peptide microarrays, for detailed analyses or optimization of protein–protein interactions
Tissue microarrays
Cellular microarrays (also called transfection microarrays)
Chemical compound microarrays
Antibody microarrays
Glycan arrays (carbohydrate arrays)
Phenotype microarrays
Reverse phase protein lysate microarrays, microarrays of lysates or serum
 Interferometric reflectance imaging sensor (IRIS)

People in the field of CMOS biotechnology are developing new kinds of microarrays. Once fed magnetic nanoparticles, individual cells can be moved independently and simultaneously on a microarray of magnetic coils. A microarray of nuclear magnetic resonance microcoils is under development.

Fabrication and operation of microarrays
A large number of technologies underlie the microarray platform, including the material substrates, spotting of biomolecular arrays, and the microfluidic packaging of the arrays. Microarrays can be categorized by how they physically isolate each element of the array, by spotting (making small physical wells), on-chip synthesis (synthesizing the target DNA probes adhered directly on the array), or bead-based (adhering samples to barcoded beads randomly distributed across the array).

See also
 Microarray databases
 Microarray analysis techniques
 DNA Microarray
 Biochip

Notes